In geometry, a dodecagram is a star polygon or compound with 12 vertices. There is one regular dodecagram polygon (with Schläfli symbol  and a turning number of 5). There are also 4 regular compounds    and

Regular dodecagram 
There is one regular form: {12/5}, containing 12 vertices, with a turning number of 5. A regular dodecagram has the same vertex arrangement as a regular dodecagon, which may be regarded as {12/1}.

Dodecagrams as regular compounds
There are four regular dodecagram star figures: {12/2}=2{6}, {12/3}=3{4}, {12/4}=4{3}, and {12/6}=6{2}. The first is a compound of two hexagons, the second is a compound of three squares, the third is a compound of four triangles, and the fourth is a compound of six straight-sided digons. The last two can be considered compounds of two compound hexagrams and the last as three compound tetragrams.

Dodecagrams as isotoxal figures
An isotoxal polygon has two vertices and one edge type within its symmetry class. There are 5 isotoxal dodecagram star with a degree of freedom of angles, which alternates vertices at two radii, one simple, 3 compounds, and 1 unicursal star.

Dodecagrams as isogonal figures
A regular dodecagram can be seen as a quasitruncated hexagon, t{6/5}={12/5}. Other isogonal (vertex-transitive) variations with equally spaced vertices can be constructed with two edge lengths.

Complete graph
Superimposing all the dodecagons and dodecagrams on each other – including the degenerate compound of six digons (line segments), {12/6} – produces the complete graph K12.

Regular dodecagrams in polyhedra
Dodecagrams can also be incorporated into uniform polyhedra. Below are the three prismatic uniform polyhedra containing regular dodecagrams (there are no other dodecagram-containing uniform polyhedra).

Dodecagrams can also be incorporated into star tessellations of the Euclidean plane.

Dodecagram Symbolism

Dodecagrams or twelve-pointed stars have been used as symbols for the following:
the twelve tribes of Israel, in Judaism
the twelve disciples, in Christianity
the twelve olympians, in Hellenic Polytheism
the twelve signs of the zodiac
the International Order of Twelve Knights and Daughters of Tabor, an African-American fraternal group
the fictional secret society Manus Sancti, in the Knights of Manus Sancti series by Bryn Donovan
 The twelve tribes of Nauru on the national flag.

See also
Stellation
Star polygon
List of regular polytopes and compounds

References

Grünbaum, B. and G.C. Shephard; Tilings and Patterns, New York: W. H. Freeman & Co., (1987), .
Grünbaum, B.; Polyhedra with Hollow Faces, Proc of NATO-ASI Conference on Polytopes ... etc. (Toronto 1993), ed T. Bisztriczky et al., Kluwer Academic (1994) pp. 43–70.
John H. Conway, Heidi Burgiel, Chaim Goodman-Strass, The Symmetries of Things 2008,  (Chapter 26. pp. 404: Regular star-polytopes Dimension 2)

12